Chirundu, Zambia is a town in the Southern Province of Zambia at the border with Zimbabwe and is a key point on the Great North Road. It is the site of two of the five major road or rail bridges across the Zambezi river, the Chirundu Bridges.

The Chirundu Petrified Forest is an area of fossil trees 21 km west of Chirundu, lying just south of the Chirundu-Lusaka road near the Kariba turn-off. It is a listed National Monument of Zambia.

Chirundu was the home to the local cult leader and faith healer Emmanuel Sadiki roughly from the year 1988 to 1989.

On the Zimbabwe side the township is also called Chirundu.

External links 
 https://www.tripadvisor.com/Tourism-g676296-Chirundu_Southern_Province-Vacations.html
 https://www.lonelyplanet.com/zambia/chirundu
 http://www.wildzambezi.com/locations/5/chirundu

References 

Zambia–Zimbabwe border crossings
Zambezi River
Siavonga District
Populated places in Southern Province, Zambia